Lammei (English: Wildfire)  is a 2002 Indian Meitei language film directed by Oken Amakcham and produced by Premjit Naoroibam and Anita Naoroibam, under the banner of Kangla Films. Denny Likmabam and Prameshwori played lead roles in the movie. The movie was made after conducting the Winter Film Workshop by Kangla Films at Hotel Excellency, Imphal. It was released formally by the titular king of Manipur, Leishemba Sanajaoba on 5 May 2002 and started its regular theatrical run at Friends Talkies, Paona Bazar on 22 May 2002. It is the first Manipuri video film to have a commercial screening at a theatre. Lammei also marked the beginning of a digital era in Manipuri cinema.

Synopsis
The film is about love and revenge and shows that truth always wins in the end. Thambal, a young lady is brutally raped by a Minister's son Rocky. But the charges for the heinous crime falls upon Chinglen, Thambal's boyfriend. Rocky's father uses various powerful means to confine Chinglen inside a jail. But Chinglen's urge for revenge spreads like a wildlife. He espaces from the police and skilfully takes lives of all those involved in Thambal's murder one after another. Justice is finally served.

Cast
 Denny Likmabam as Chinglen
 Prameshwori as Thambal
 Iboyaima Khuman as Thambal's father
 Longjam Ongbi Lalitabi as Chinglen's mother
 Rocky as Rocky
 Gurumayum Kalpana as Leishna, Chinglen's lawyer
 Prameshwor Oinam as Rocky's lawyer
 Baby Mutum Yaiphabi as Baby Thambal
 Akash
 Usha
 Bidyapati
 Tombi
 Jiten

Soundtrack
Oken Amakcham and Lalambung Imo composed the soundtrack for the film and W.  Rajen, Rajendra Okram, Ashajit Angomcha and Manoraja Thokchom wrote the lyrics. The songs are titled Wakhal Ethak Houre, Manglan Khuding, Mitchiduna Eibu Ngaohalle, Lammei Lammei and Kijeine Eidi.

External links

References

Meitei-language films
2002 films